NGC 31 is a spiral galaxy located in the constellation Phoenix. It was discovered on October 28, 1834 by the astronomer John Herschel. Its morphological type is SB(rs)cd, meaning that it is a late-type barred spiral galaxy.

References

External links
 
 

Galaxies discovered in 1834
0031
Barred spiral galaxies
Phoenix (constellation)
000751
18341028